The Florida mud turtle (Kinosternon steindachneri)  is a species of turtle in the family Kinosternidae. The species is endemic to the state of Florida in the United States.

Taxonomy
Although originally described as a species, K. steindachneri was long considered a subspecies of the eastern mud turtle (K. subrubum), but a 2013 analysis found there to be no data supporting this classification, and supported its recognition as its own distinct species.

Geographic range
K. steindachneri is found in peninsular Florida. Its type locality is near Orlando.

Etymology
The specific name, steindachneri, is in honor of Austrian herpetologist Franz Steindachner.

References

Further reading
Carr A (1940). "A Contribution to the Herpetology of Florida". University of Florida Publication, Biological Science Series 3 (1): 1–118. (Kinosternon subrubrum steindachneri, new status).
Powell R, Conant R, Collins JT (2016). Peterson Field Guide to Reptiles and Amphibians of Eastern and Central North America, Fourth Edition. Boston and New York: Houghton Mifflin Harcourt. xiv + 494 pp., 47 color plates, 207 figures. . (Kinosternon steindachneri, pp. 225–226, Figure 102).
Siebenrock F (1906). "Eine neue Cinosternum-Art aus Florida". Zoologischer Anzeiger 30: 727–728. (Cinosternum steindachneri, new species). (in German).

Kinosternon
Endemic fauna of Florida